In the philosophy of mind and consciousness, the explanatory gap is the proposed difficulty that physicalist philosophies have in explaining how physical properties give rise to the way things feel subjectively when they are experienced. It is a term introduced by philosopher Joseph Levine. In the 1983 paper in which he first used the term, he used as an example the sentence, "Pain is the firing of C fibers", pointing out that while it might be valid in a physiological sense, it does not help us to understand how pain feels.

The explanatory gap has vexed and intrigued philosophers and AI researchers alike for decades and caused considerable debate. Bridging this gap (that is, finding a satisfying mechanistic explanation for experience and qualia) is known as "the hard problem".

To take an example of a phenomenon in which there is no gap, a modern computer's behavior can be adequately explained by its physical components alone, such as its circuitry and software. In contrast, it is thought by many mind-body dualists (e.g. René Descartes, David Chalmers) that subjective conscious experience constitutes a separate effect that demands another cause that is either outside the physical world (dualism) or due to an as yet unknown physical phenomenon (see for instance quantum mind, indirect realism).

Proponents of dualism claim that the mind is substantially and qualitatively different from the brain and that the existence of something metaphysically extra-physical is required to "fill the gap".  Similarly, some argue that there are further facts—facts that do not follow logically from the physical facts of the world—about conscious experience. For example, they argue that what it is like to experience seeing red does not follow logically from the physical facts of the world.

Implications 
The nature of the explanatory gap has been the subject of some debate.  For example, some consider it to simply be a limit on our current explanatory ability.  They argue that future findings in neuroscience or future work from philosophers could close the gap.  However, others have taken a stronger position and argued that the gap is a definite limit on our cognitive abilities as humans—no amount of further information will allow us to close it.  There has also been no consensus regarding what metaphysical conclusions the existence of the gap provides.  Those wishing to use its existence to support dualism have often taken the position that an epistemic gap—particularly if it is a definite limit on our cognitive abilities—necessarily entails a metaphysical gap.

Levine and others have wished to either remain silent on the matter or argue that no such metaphysical conclusion should be drawn.  He agrees that conceivability (as used in the Zombie and inverted spectrum arguments) is flawed as a means of establishing metaphysical realities; but he points out that even if we come to the metaphysical conclusion that qualia are physical, they still present an explanatory problem.
While I think this materialist response is right in the end, it does not suffice to put the mind-body problem to rest. Even if conceivability considerations do not establish that the mind is in fact distinct from the body, or that mental properties are metaphysically irreducible to physical properties, still they do demonstrate that we lack an explanation of the mental in terms of the physical.

However, such an epistemological or explanatory problem might indicate an underlying metaphysical issue—the non-physicality of qualia, even if not proven by conceivability arguments is far from ruled out.
In the end, we are right back where we started. The explanatory gap argument doesn't demonstrate a gap in nature, but a gap in our understanding of nature. Of course, a plausible explanation for there being a gap in our understanding of nature is that there is a genuine gap in nature. But so long as we have countervailing reasons for doubting the latter, we have to look elsewhere for an explanation of the former.

At the core of the problem, according to Levine, is our lack of understanding of what it means for a qualitative experience to be fully comprehended. He emphasizes that we don't even know to what extent it is appropriate to inquire into the nature of this kind of experience. He uses the laws of gravity as an example, which laws seem to explain gravity completely yet do not account for the gravitational constant. Similarly to the way in which gravity appears to be an inexplicable brute fact of nature, the case of qualia may be one in which we are either lacking essential information or in which we're exploring a natural phenomenon that simply is not further apprehensible. Levine suggests that, as qualitative experience of a physical or functional state may simply be such a brute fact, perhaps we should consider whether or not it is really necessary to find a more complete explanation of qualitative experience.

Levine points out that the solution to the problem of understanding how much there is to be known about qualitative experience seems even more difficult because we also lack a way to articulate what it means for actualities to be knowable in the manner that he has in mind. He does conclude that there are good reasons why we wish for a more complete explanation of qualitative experiences. One very significant reason is that consciousness appears to only manifest where mentality is demonstrated in physical systems that are quite highly organized. This, of course, may be indicative of a human capacity for reasoning that is no more than the result of organized functions. Levine expresses that it seems counterintuitive to accept this implication that the human brain, so highly organized as it is, could be no more than a routine executor. He notes that although, at minimum, Materialism appears to entail reducibility of anything that is not physically primary to an explanation of its dependence on a mechanism that can be described in terms of physical fundamentals, that kind of reductionism doesn't attempt to reduce psychology to physical science. However, it still entails that there are inexplicable classes of facts which are not treated as relevant to statements pertinent to psychology.

Many philosophers have doubted the idea that explanatory gap could be solved, being that proponents of the argument use it to support arguments against materialism, physicalism and naturalism, its arguments appear to resist any scientific or philosophical solution to the problem. David Chalmers has also acknowledged that even when science bridges the gap to some degree, the problem will persist.

See also 

 Animal consciousness
 Blindsight
 Causality
 Consciousness
 Explanation
 Functionalism (philosophy of mind)
 Further facts
 Ideasthesia
 Materialism
 Mind
 Mind-body problem
 Philosophical zombie
 Philosophy of mind
 Problem of other minds
 Qualia
 Reductionism
 Reverse engineering
 Sentience
 Solipsism
 Turing test
 Vitalism

References

External links 
 Joseph Levine's homepage
 "What is it like to be a bat?"  Thomas Nagel, The Philosophical Review LXXXIII, 4 (October 1974): 435–50.

Arguments in philosophy of mind
Consciousness studies
Mind–body problem
Philosophical analogies
Philosophy of science